William the Good is the ninth book in the Just William series of books by Richmal Crompton. It was first published in 1928.

Short stories
William- the Good Suspecting his sister Ethel is a kleptomaniac and drunkard, William sets out to "reform" her.
William- The Great Actor William is enlisted to provide the "special effects" in an amateur theatrical performance.
William and the Archers When the Territorial Army stage manoeuveres near the village William believes a foreign invasion is underway.
Willian - the Money Maker The Outlaws are (as usual) short of funds, and William makes a rash promise to rectify the situation.
William - the Avenger William and Ginger take revenge on a bully whom they believe has been tolerated for too long.
Parrots for Ethel Ethel is in quarantine and pursued by two like-minded suitors. However, there is a mix-up between the suitor's gifts and the animals for William's zoo.
One Good Turn William finds himself in the uncomfortable position of being in debt to Robert.
William's Lucky Day William tries to imitate his hero William Tell - with disastrous consequences.
A Little Adventure After a spate of burglaries in the village, William and Ginger believe they have found a vital clue.

1928 short story collections
Children's short story collections
Short story collections by Richmal Crompton
Just William
1928 children's books
George Newnes Ltd books